The 1978–79 Yugoslav Cup was the 31st season of the top football knockout competition in SFR Yugoslavia, the Yugoslav Cup, also known as the "Marshal Tito Cup" (Kup Maršala Tita), since its establishment in 1946. It was won by NK Rijeka, who successfully managed to defend the title having won the 1977–78 Yugoslav Cup.

Calendar

First round

Second round

Quarter-finals

Semi-finals

Final

First leg

Second leg

Rijeka win 2–1 on aggregate.

See also
1978–79 Yugoslav First League

External links
1978/79 Yugoslav Cup details at Rec.Sport.Soccer Statistics Foundation

Yugoslav Cup seasons
Cup
Yugo